Beijing Haidian International School (Haiwai) is an international school in Beijing, China. The school, established by Beijing Haidian Foreign Language Shi Yan School, serves up to Year 12.

References

External links
 Beijing Haidian International School
  Beijing Haidian International School

International schools in Beijing
Schools in Haidian District
Educational institutions with year of establishment missing